Hanover Township is one of twenty-three townships in Jo Daviess County, Illinois, USA.  As of the 2010 census, its population was 1,201 and it contained 689 housing units.

Geography

Cities, towns, villages
 Hanover.

Cemeteries
The township contains Lost Mound Cemetery.

Major highways
  Illinois Route 84

Rivers
 Mississippi River.

Landmarks
 Lock and Dam No. 12 of the Mississippi River.
 Savanna US Army Depot.

Demographics

School districts
 River Ridge Community Unit School District 210.

Political districts
 Illinois' 16th congressional district.
 State House District 89.
 State Senate District 45.

References
 .
 United States Census Bureau 2007 TIGER/Line Shapefiles.
 United States National Atlas.

External links
 Jo Daviess County official site.
 City-Data.com.
 Illinois State Archives.
 Township Officials of Illinois.

Townships in Jo Daviess County, Illinois
Townships in Illinois